Mount Everest is the Earth's highest mountain peak, located on the Nepal / China border in Asia.

Everest may also refer to:

Places
Everest, Kansas, a small city in Brown County, Kansas, United States
Everest Base Camp, two base camps, each on opposite sides of Mount Everest
Everest gasfield, a gasfield located in the Central North Sea, near Aberdeen, Scotland
Everest (restaurant), a Michelin rated French restaurant in Chicago

People
Barbara Everest (1890–1968), a British actress
F. Alton Everest (1909–2005), an American acoustical engineer
Frank F. Everest (1904–1983), a US Air Force general
Frank Kendall Everest, Jr. (1920–2004), a US Air Force officer
George Everest (1790–1866), Surveyor General of India, namesake of Mount Everest
Hiram Bond Everest (1830–1913), an American inventor
Jack Everest (born 1908), Irish footballer
James Everest (1918–1992), New Zealand cricketer
Josiah T. Everest (1800–1873), an American lawyer and politician
Kate Asaphine Everest (later Levi) (1859–1939), American writer and social worker
Mary Everest Boole (1832–1916), a British mathematician and author
Wesley Everest (1890–1919), an American member of the Industrial Workers of the World (IWW) and a World War I veteran

Arts, entertainment, and media

Films
Everest (1998 film), an American documentary film 
Everest (2015 film), an American biographical adventure film

Literature
"Everest" (short story), a 1953 science fiction short story by Isaac Asimov

Music
Everest (band), American rock band
"Mount Everest" , 2019 song by English singer Labrinth from his second studio album Imagination & the Misfit Kid
Everest Records, an American stereophonic record label
Everest (opera), a one-act opera composed by Joby Talbot

Television
Everest (Indian TV series)
Everest '82, a 2008 Canadian drama film miniseries
Everest: Beyond the Limit, a reality television series broadcast by Discovery Channel

Brands and enterprises
Everest (cigarette), a cigarette brand, manufactured, distributed and market by the Zimbabwe arm of British American Tobacco company.
Everest Home Improvement, a British double glazing and home improvement company
Ford Everest, a sport utility vehicle produced by the Ford Motor Company
Everest Spices, an Indian spices brand
Everest Re, a Bermuda-based provider of reinsurance and insurance

Computing
 AIDA64, formerly known as Everest, a Windows diagnostics tool

Education
Everest College, a system of for-profit colleges in the United States and the Canadian province of Ontario
Everest University, a part of the Corinthian Colleges' family of schools

Sport
Club Deportivo Everest, an Ecuador football team
Mount Everest Nepal, a Palaua football club
The Everest, an annual Australian Turf Club horse race run since 2017

Other uses
Everest, a husky member of the PAW Patrol
EVEREST, a 2007 study of US voting machines
Expedition Everest, a steel roller coaster located at Disney's Animal Kingdom in Florida, USA
Everest, Armstrong Whitworth Ensign aircraft

See also